Kirkgunȝeon is a village and civil parish in Dumfries and Galloway, south west Scotland. The civil parish is in the former county of Kirkcudbrightshire, and is bounded by the parishes Lochrutton to the north, Urr to the west, Colvend and Southwick to the south and New Abbey to the east.

Kirkgunzeon is recorded in c.1200 as Kirkwynnin. Wynnin represents a Cumbric form of the Gaelic Finnén, a diminutive of Findbarr. William J. Watson takes this to be Findbarr of Moyville. Thomas Clancy argues the name commemorates Uinniau a local British saint, not recorded in literary records.

Government
Kirkgunzeon Community Council is one of 23 community councils in the Stewartry district. The community council serves an estimated population of 319. The maximum number of voting members of the community council is 11.

Kirkgunzeon is in electoral ward 06 Abbey. It is part of the Dumfries and Galloway county constituency in the Parliament of the United Kingdom and part of the Galloway and West Dumfries  constituency of the Scottish Parliament (Holyrood).

Education
Kirkgunzeon Primary School serves the village and surrounding area as well as children from the district of Beeswing. The school is partnered with Colvend Primary School and Palnackie Primary School; these schools share a headteacher. Children from Kirkgunzeon attend Dalbeattie Primary School Nursery.

The present school building was built in 1964. It is a single storey building, with two classrooms. It has capacity for 47 pupils. The previous school building, now a dwelling, was on the other side of the river in the original village of Kirkgunzeon. It served pupils up to the statutory leaving age from the start of compulsory education in 1972 until 1945, after which it became a primary school.

The First Statistical Account of 1791-99 records one school and one school master in the parish. The Second Statistical Account, written in 1844, notes that there was also a  school "at the lower end of the parish", built by the farmers at their own expense.

Religious sites
Kirkgunzeon Parish Church held its final service on Sunday, 13 October 2013. The Church of Scotland congregations of Kirkgunzeon and Dalbeattie parishes were officially joined on Wednesday, 16 October 2013. Kirkgunzeon had previously been linked with Lochend and New Abbey church of Scotland on 24 June 2009. This link was severed on 25 September 2013.

On 4 August 2015 Dumfries and Galloway Council received an application to alter the church building to a dwelling.

Cultural references
Kirkgunzeon railway station is mentioned briefly in Dorothy L. Sayer's novel The Five Red Herrings, which is set in Galloway.

See also 
 List of listed buildings in Kirkgunzeon

References

Further reading 

Villages in Dumfries and Galloway
Parishes in Dumfries and Galloway